Ireland is an international men's water polo team representing the island of Ireland. The Irish Water Polo Association (IWPA) was founded in 1964 and is affiliated to Swim Ireland.

History

The rules of water polo were originally developed by William Wilson in the mid-nineteenth century. The game was originally played in rivers and lakes in England and Scotland.  Between 1890 and 1900, the game developed in Europe using British rules, but a different game was being played in the United States.

During the nineteenth and twentieth centuries, the four Home Nations — England, Ireland, Scotland, and Wales — contested regular internationals against each other.  Ireland were often outclassed, losing every match against England from 1895 to 1910. However, Noel Purcell won a gold medal on the Great Britain team at the 1920 Olympic water polo tournament.

In 1922, the Irish Free State seceded from the United Kingdom and the Olympic Council of Ireland joined the International Olympic Committee. Purcell captained Ireland at the 1924 Olympics. Ireland had a bye in the first round when Austria pulled out. In the second round, they lost 4–2 against Czechoslovakia.  At the 1924 Tailteann Games, Ireland beat a team representing England. 
In the 1928 Olympic tournament, Ireland lost its only match 11–1 to Belgium. The expense of travel to Los Angeles ruled out participating in the 1932 tournament, and Ireland boycotted the 1936 Games in a dispute over Northern Ireland.

Ireland has not competed in the Olympics since 1928, and has never qualified for the World Championships. Although Home International matches continued into the 1960s, the transition to higher-specification indoor swimming pools was long delayed in Ireland.  The outdoor sea baths at Clontarf and Blackrock fell into disuse. The IWPA was established in 1964 and the first pool to meet FINA regulations for length, breadth, and depth opened in 2002.

Recent results

2007 European 'B' Championships
Qualifying Group 'C', in Kotor, Montenegro:
16 March: lost 2–25 v. Montenegro
17 March: won 10–9 v. Switzerland
18 March: won 10–8 v. Austria
Finals, in Manchester:
Group B:
8 July : lost 5–33 v. France
9 July : lost 3–19 v. Ukraine
10 July : lost 5–20 v. Great Britain
11 July : lost 9–15 v. Israel
12 July : lost 5–16 v. Poland
 Classification playoff:
 13 July : lost 6–13 v. Malta

Note:

Since 2008
In February 2009, Ireland played a five-nation tournament in Denmark, losing all four matches.

In October 2019, Ireland competed in the 2019 FINA Water Polo Challengers' Cup, finishing 2nd in their group winning three out of the four games. Ireland lost the bronze-medal match to Indonesia 14-9 and therefore finishing fourth.

Team

Current squad

Results summary

Olympic Games:
1924 — 9th
1928 — 14th
1932–2016 — Did not enter.

European Championship:
 2007: 12th ('B' Championships)
FINA Challengers’ Cup:

 2019 — 4th

References

External links
 International Senior Men Irish Water Polo Association Website

Water
Men's national water polo teams
National water polo teams in Europe
National water polo teams by country